Rojewo may refer to the following places:
Rojewo, Greater Poland Voivodeship (west-central Poland)
Rojewo, Inowrocław County in Kuyavian-Pomeranian Voivodeship (north-central Poland)
Rojewo, Lubusz Voivodeship (west Poland)
Rojewo, Rypin County in Kuyavian-Pomeranian Voivodeship (north-central Poland)